

Champion
On March 22, 1970, in Dauphin, the Kings won their second consecutive MJHL title, capturing the Turnbull Memorial Trophy. The Kings completed a successful defense of the trophy by virtue of a 2–1 victory giving them a four-game sweep over the St. James Canadians.

Regular season

Playoffs
Divisional Semi-Finals
Kenora defeated Portage 4-games-to-2
St. James defeated West Kildonan 4-games-to-2
Divisional Finals
Dauphin defeated Kenora 4-games-to-1
Winnipeg lost to St. James 4-games-to-3 
Turnbull Cup Championship
Dauphin defeated St. James 4-games-to-none
Western Memorial Cup Semi-Final
Dauphin lost to Westfort Hurricanes (TBJHL) 4-games-to-2

Awards

All-Star Teams

References
Manitoba Junior Hockey League
Manitoba Hockey Hall of Fame
Hockey Hall of Fame
Winnipeg Free Press Archives
Brandon Sun Archives

MJHL
Manitoba Junior Hockey League seasons